Tomi Räisänen (born 2 June 1976) is a Finnish composer.

Biography 

Räisänen was born in Helsinki. He studied composition from 2000 to 2006 at the Sibelius Academy under Erkki Jokinen graduating as the master of music. Before entering the Sibelius Academy he read music at the University of Helsinki studying musicology and composition under Harri Vuori. He has also participated in several international composition masterclasses, seminars and workshops under composers such as Louis Andriessen, Brian Ferneyhough, Jonathan Harvey, Michael Jarrell, Jouni Kaipainen, Magnus Lindberg, Philippe Manoury and Marco Stroppa.

Since early 2000s Räisänen's list of works has rapidly grown and contains around 100 compositions covering works from solo pieces to chamber and choral music, and includes orchestral works and concertos. Räisänen is one of the most performed composers in his generation in Finland. His music has been widely performed and broadcast in 44 countries across Europe, North and South America, Asia and Australia.

In 2021 Räisänen won two composition competitions: The Siuntio 560 (Lux Musicae) Composition Competition with the ensemble work Tele and the Composition Competition for the Tampere Piano Competition with the work Hile. In 2019 Marimba Concerto Portal was awarded with the 3rd Prize and it won the Audience Prize in the IV International Uuno Klami Composition Competition in Finland. In 2007, Räisänen won the international Irino Prize (shared prize) in Japan with his work Stheno (2006). In year 2002 he was awarded with the 2nd prize in the International Composing Competition “2 Agosto” in Italy with his work Nomad (2002).

Awards and honors 

 2021: 1st prize in the Siuntio 560 (Lux Musicae, Finland) Composition Competition with the work Tele
 2021: 1st prize in the Composition Competition for the Tampere Piano Competition (Finland) with the work Hile
 2019: 3rd prize and winner of the audience prize in the IV International Uuno Klami Composition Competition (Finland) with the Marimba Concerto Portal 
 2007: 1st prize (shared) in The Irino Prize Competition (Tokyo, Japan) with the work Stheno (2006)
 2002: 2nd prize in the International Composing Competition “2 Agosto” (Bologna, Italy) with the work Nomad (2002)

Works 

 Crossings (2022) contrabass solo, tape
 Under the Apple Tree (2001/2021) bassoon quartet
 Sale of Airbags (2021) recorder, guitar, tape
 Tele (2021) ensemble, TV set
 Portal (Marimba Concerto, 2018/2021) version for orchestra
 Superspreader (2021) bass recorder solo
 @ch (2020) clarinet, cello, piano
 Hile (2020) piano solo
 L'homme armé (2003/2010/2020) alto saxophone, percussion duo
 Kiseki-no-ippon-matsu (2020) violin duo
 Inside a Mechanical Clock (2008/2020) guitar, contrabassoon, accordion
 Axis Mundi (Double Concerto for Bassoon & Contrabassoon, 2020)
 Verso (2019) alto flute, viola, contrabass, piano, tape 
 Fanfare (2019) wind ensemble
 i0! (2019) bass flute, paetzold recorder, harp, harpsichord, tape 
 Portal (Marimba Concerto, 2018) version for sinfonietta
 Unknown (2018) solo flute, tape
 Dialogue with... (2018) music and sound design for video work
 Juoni (2018) theorbo solo, tape
 Magus Magnus (2008/2017) orchestra
 Smash!t (Horn Concerto, 2016)
 Falls (2016) piano six hands
 Under the Apple Tree (2001/2016) sax trio
 No-Go (2011/2016) violin duo
 Cornucopia (2015) recorder, viola da gamba, harpsichord, tape
 Pikkuväki (2015) recorder solo, tape
 Inside a Mechanical Clock (2008/2015) mandolin, guitar, keyboard 
 Dive (2015) recorder solo, tape
 Theia (2015) orchestra
 Ouvrez la Tête (2014) piano solo
 Inside a Mechanical Clock (2008/2014) accordion duo
 Midsommar(so)natten (2010/2014) violin duo, tape
 Väki (2013) solo horn, tape
 Mirrie Dancers (Alto Flute Concerto, 2013)
 No-Go (2011/2013) brass quartet
 We shall meet in the place where there is no darkness (2013) video work / sound installation 
 Inside a Mechanical Clock (2008/2013) 2 recorders, theorbo
 Taiga (2012) recorder quintet, tape
 Hiisi (2012) bass clarinet, cello, piano
 Tea with the Devil (2012) film music
 Louhen Loitsut (2012) wind orchestra
 Aulos at the Dionysian Feast (2004/2012) 3 recorders, bass clarinet, 2 perc.
 No-Go (2011) alto flute, violin
 Balloon Work (2011) guitar, 4 balloon players
 Around the Circle (2004/2011) recorder, cello, harpsichord
 Puumies (2011) orchestra
 Die Sauna der 7 Brüder (2010/2011) chamber orchestra, tape
 Sublunar Mechanics (Piano Concerto, 2011)
 Gatekeepers (2003/2010) recorder, accordion
 Ludi Caeli (2006-2010) brass quintet
 Die Sauna der 7 Brüder (2010) ensemble, tape
 Gatekeepers (2003/2010) clarinet, accordion
 Midsommar(so)natten (2010) violin, cello
 Around the Circle (2004/2010) clarinet, viola, piano
 Laavlâ (2010) solo soprano + wind orchestra, tape
 Under the Apple Tree (2001/2009) recorder trio
 Fortuna Favoris (2009) solo soprano, mixed choir, orchestra
 A Night at the Park Güell (2009) baryton (viola da gamba), viola, cello
 Grus (2008) cello, accordion, tape
 Inside a Mechanical Clock (2008) contrabass, accordion
 Magus Magnus (2008) chamber orchestra
 Kyynelketju (2007) recorder solo
 Broken Flower (2007) ensemble
 The City Listens (2007) Choir (SATB) a cappella
 Under the Apple Tree (2001/2007) harpsichord, accordion
 Liquid Mosaic (2007) 2 guitars, tape
 Almtraum (2006) oboe, trombone, cello, piano
 Stheno (2006) recorder tubes, prepared guitar, tape 
 Dreamgate (2006) toy pianos, tape
 Giant Butterfly (2006) solo contrabass + chamber orchestra
 Delirium Nocturnum (2006) orchestra
 Under the Apple Tree (2001/2006) flute, a.flute, clarinet, b.clarinet
 Abeyance (2005) chamber orchestra
 Sea of Tranquility (Guitar Concerto, 2005)
 Piano Quintet (2005) piano, string quartet
 Forged (2005) guitar solo
 Aulos at the Dionysian Feast (2004) 2 recorders, guitar
 Around the Circle (2004) flute, viola, piano
 Lacrimosa (2004) 4 voices, ensemble
 Triquad (2004) horn, trombone, tuba, harp
 Euryale (2004) clarinet, alto saxophone, piano
 Duo Concertante (2004) solo cl./bass cl. and solo acc. + ensemble
 Insiders (2004) grand piano played by 3 musicians
 Under the Apple Tree (2001/2004) recorder quartet
 Gatekeepers (2003) sheng, accordion
 Follow the Circle (2003) clarinet, violin, cello, piano
 Elevator Music on Mars (2003/2009) sax., electric gtr., synth., perc., tape
 Time Labyrinth (2003) cello solo
 Under the Apple Tree (2001/2003) wind orchestra
 L'homme armé (2003) alto saxophone, percussion
 Peilisali (2002) accordion solo
 Nomad (2002) solo violin + orchestra
 Under the Apple Tree (2001/2002) orchestra
 Battaglia (2002) big band
 Under the Apple Tree (2001) piano solo
 Diabolic Dialogue (2001) clarinet (or oboe), cello
 Two Gardens (2000) flute, cello, piano
 Nexus (2000) flute, piano, mixed choir
 Némulat (1999) baryton, piano, violin

Discography

 Insiders - junctQín Keyboard Collective: Stephanie Chua, Elaine Lau, Joseph Ferretti (reTHINK, Redshift Records, 2020)
 Die Sauna der 7 Brüder, Sea of Tranquility, Mirrie Dancers, Grus - Mikko Ikäheimo, Carla Rees, Neue Musik im Ostseeraum (Sauna, Ensemble Works, Edition Troy EDTCD 005, 2016)
 Väki - Tommi Hyytinen (Tired Light, Pilfink Records JJVCD-162, 2016)
 Midsommar(so)natten - Mainly Two: John Garner, Marie Schreer (Synergy, Turquoise Coconut, 2016)
 Under the Apple Tree - Bravade Recorder Quartet (Reflections of the Past and Present, Pilfink Records JJVCD-128, 2014)
 Abeyance - Ensemble Modern, John B Hedges (they are, Ensemble Modern Medien EMCD-021/22, 2013)
 Euryale - Heikki Nikula, Olli-Pekka Tuomisalo, Risto-Matti Marin (Chambersax, Pilfink Records JJVCD-123, 2013)
 A Night at the Park Güell - Finnish Baryton Trio (Luminous Baryton, Edition Troy EDTCD 002, 2012)
 L'homme armé - Olli-Pekka Tuomisalo, Aki Virtanen (SaxCussion, OPTCD-11009, 2011)
 Ludi Caeli - Helsinki Brass Quintet (H.B.Q., Edition Troy EDTCD 001, 2011)
 Stheno - Erik Bosgraaf, Izhar Elias (big eye, phenom records PH0713, 2007)
 Under the Apple Tree - Elisa Järvi (PianoNyt!, Sibelius Academy SACD 17, 2004)

References

External links 
 Tomi Räisänen's official webpage
 Tomi Räisänen on Music Finland
 Tomi Räisänen's official YouTube page

1976 births
Living people
21st-century classical composers
Finnish classical composers
Sibelius Academy alumni
Musicians from Helsinki
Finnish male classical composers
21st-century male musicians
21st-century Finnish composers